Liu Ningyi (December, 1907 – February 15, 1994) was a Chinese male politician, who served as the vice chairperson of the Standing Committee of the National People's Congress.

References 

1907 births
1994 deaths
Vice Chairpersons of the National People's Congress